Ovambo may refer to:

Ovambo language, Bantu language of Namibia
Ovambo people, Bantu people of Namibia
Ovamboland, former Bantustan in South West Africa (now Namibia)
Ovambo sparrowhawk (Accipiter ovampensis), an African bird of prey

Language and nationality disambiguation pages